J. Blaine Anderson (January 19, 1922 – April 16, 1988) was a United States circuit judge of the United States Court of Appeals for the Ninth Circuit and previously was a United States district judge of the United States District Court for the District of Idaho.

Education and career

Born in Trenton, Utah, Anderson was raised in Pocatello, Idaho. He attended Idaho State College in Pocatello and completed his bachelor's degree at the University of Washington in Seattle. Anderson then attended the University of Idaho in Moscow and received a Juris Doctor from its College of Law in 1949. He was admitted to the bar and was in private practice from 1949 to 1971 in Blackfoot, Idaho.

Federal judicial service

Anderson was nominated by President Richard Nixon on December 1, 1971, to a seat on the United States District Court for the District of Idaho vacated by Judge Fredrick Monroe Taylor. He was confirmed by the United States Senate on December 4, 1971, and received his commission on December 9, 1971. His service was terminated on July 23, 1976, due to elevation to the Ninth Circuit.

Anderson was nominated by President Gerald Ford on June 18, 1976, to a seat on the United States Court of Appeals for the Ninth Circuit vacated by Judge Montgomery Oliver Koelsch. He was confirmed by the Senate on July 2, 1976, and received his commission the same day. His service was terminated on April 16, 1988, due to his death of a brain aneurysm, in Boise, Idaho. He and his wife Grace are buried at Morris Hill Cemetery in Boise.

References

Sources
 
 

Judges of the United States Court of Appeals for the Ninth Circuit
Judges of the United States District Court for the District of Idaho
People from Blackfoot, Idaho
United States court of appeals judges appointed by Gerald Ford
United States district court judges appointed by Richard Nixon
20th-century American judges
20th-century American lawyers
Idaho lawyers
University of Idaho alumni
University of Idaho College of Law alumni
1922 births
1988 deaths
People from Cache County, Utah
People from Pocatello, Idaho